{{Infobox concert
| concert_tour_name = 2013 Girls Generation "Girls and Peace" World Tour
| image             = Girls&PeaceWorldTour.jpg
| image_caption     = Promotional image for the Girls' Generation World Tour Girls & Peace'| landscape         = yes
| artist            = Girls' Generation
| location          = Asia
| type              = World
| album             = Girls & Peace  I Got A Boy
| start_date        = 
| end_date          = 
| number_of_legs    = 7
| number_of_shows   = 2 in South Korea 2 in Taiwan1 in Indonesia 1 in Singapore2 in Hong Kong1 in Thailand1 in Macau 10 in total
| URL               =
| last_tour         = Girls & Peace: 2nd Japan Tour(2013)
| this_tour         = Girls' Generation World Tour "Girls & Peace"(2013–2014)
| next_tour         = Girls' Generation Japan 3rd Tour 2014(2014)
| Misc              =
}}Girls' Generation World Tour "Girls & Peace"' is the third concert tour by South Korean girl group Girls' Generation. The tour was officially announced in April 2013 after the last 2 days of "2nd Japan Tour" with two dates in South Korea and plans for future dates across the globe. Although initially announced as a "world" tour, the group only visited seven cities in six countries across East Asia and Southeast Asia. They released a DVD of Seoul concert, 'Girls' Generation - World Tour: Girls & Peace in Seoul' on March 30, 2015.

History
The tour was officially announced by their company S.M. Entertainment on April 26, 2013, with two dates in Seoul at the Olympic Park. The tour is the first world tour by Girls' Generation after having toured Asia five times before and just a week after completing their second Japanese tour, Girls & Peace: 2nd Japan Tour.

The South Korean dates are the first time the group has performed solo in South Korea in two years following their concerts on the 2011 Girls' Generation Tour in July 2011. Tickets for the Seoul concert were sold through G-Market on May 9. Plans for a fan tour and tickets to the Seoul concerts exclusively for overseas fans were announced at the same time through SM Entertainment's Culture & Content'' website. On June 5, concerts in Taiwan were announced through the Taipei Arena website, for July 20 and 21, 2013.

At the tour press conference on June 8, it was announced the girls would be heading to the United States and South America following the group's concert in Taipei in July. However, this never came to fruition.

On June 22, 2013, the group announced at the 2013 Asia Style Collection held in Singapore that they would return to the city in October on the tour.

On August 2, 2013, Dyandra Entertainment, a promoter in Indonesia announced the Indonesian concert through their Twitter account. The Indonesian concert was held on September 14, 2013, at Mata Elang International Stadium, Ancol, North Jakarta. This was the first solo concert for Girls' Generation in Indonesia.

On August 15, 2013, Managing Director of Running Into The Sun, Beatrice Chia-Richmond announced that the concert in Singapore will be held on October 12, 2013.

On November 1, 2013, SM True Facebook official fanpage, a promoter of S.M. Entertainment in Thailand announced that the concert in Thailand will be held on January 11, 2014, at Impact, Muang Thong Thani.

On February 15, 2014, during the group's first concert in Macau, Taeyeon announced that the show would be the last stop of the tour but that their next world tour would be starting soon. Sooyoung then added that following their third Japan arena tour which would be starting soon, a new tour would commence to promote their new mini album Mr.Mr.

Set list

Tour dates

Media
Television

Personnel
 Artist: Taeyeon, Jessica, Sunny, Tiffany, Hyoyeon, Yuri, Sooyoung, Yoona, Seohyun
 Tour organizer: S.M. Entertainment
 Tour promoter: Dream Maker Entercom (South Korea), Super Dome (Taiwan), Dyandra Entertainment & 7Kings Entertainment (Indonesia), Running Into The Sun (Singapore), Media Asia Entertainment Limited & East Asia Entertainment Limited (China), SM True (Thailand)
 Tour guest performers : Tasty (Hong Kong, Macau)

Gallery

References

Girls' Generation concert tours
2013 concert tours
2014 concert tours